The Way Through the Night (German:Der Weg durch die Nacht) is a 1929 German silent film directed by Robert Dinesen and starring Käthe von Nagy.

The film's art direction was by Leopold Blonder.

Cast
In alphabetical order
 Margita Alfvén 
 Friedrich Ettel 
 René Navarre 
 Sophie Pagay 
 Imre Ráday 
 Eva Schablinski 
 Margarete Schön 
 Franz Stein
 Käthe von Nagy

References

Bibliography
 Bock, Hans-Michael & Bergfelder, Tim. The Concise CineGraph. Encyclopedia of German Cinema. Berghahn Books, 2009.

External links

1929 films
Films based on works by John Knittel
Films of the Weimar Republic
Films directed by Robert Dinesen
German silent feature films
German black-and-white films